"Down in Flames" is a song written by Michael Clark and Jeff Stevens, and recorded by American country music band  Blackhawk. It was released in December 1994 as the fourth single from their self-titled debut album. It peaked at number 10 on both the United States Billboard Hot Country Singles & Tracks and the Canadian RPM Country Tracks charts.

Critical reception
Deborah Evans Price, of Billboard magazine reviewed the song favorably, calling it "an incendiary love affair." She goes on to say that the song is "marked by tight harmonies and anchored by Henry Paul's breathy lead vocal."

Chart performance

Year-end charts

References

1994 songs
Blackhawk (band) songs
1994 singles
Songs written by Michael Clark (songwriter)
Songs written by Jeff Stevens (singer)
Arista Nashville singles
Song recordings produced by Mark Bright (record producer)